The chapters of Peace Maker and Peacemaker Kurogane are written and illustrated by Nanae Chrono.
Peace Maker was published in Japan by Enix before it was transferred to Mag Garden. It was licensed and published in North America and Germany by Tokyopop. The manga was also licensed and published in Italy by Star Comics.

Peacemaker Kurogane itself was started as a new series in Mag Garden's Monthly Comic Blade in 2001. It was later licensed by ADV Manga, which released three of the five volumes before putting it on hold indefinitely. After the license lapsed, Tokyopop acquired it, releasing four volumes. The manga was licensed and published in France by Kami, in Germany by Tokyopop and in Russia by Comics Factory.



Volume list

Peace Maker

Enix edition

Mag Garden edition

Peacemaker Kurogane

References

Peace Maker